Ashma is a long narrative poem of the Sani people.

Ashma may also refer to:

 Ashma, Sudan, a village in the south-west of Sudan